Epermenia scurella is a moth of the  family Epermeniidae. It is found in the mountains of central and southern Europe.

The larvae feed on Thesium species.

References

Moths described in 1851
Epermeniidae
Moths of Europe